The Weserflug We 271 was a German flying boat prototype, first flown just before World War II.

History

This amphibious flying boat was produced in 1938 by the German aviation company Weser Flugzeugbau GmbH. The aircraft was a twin engine, all-metal transport with a cantilever high wing. Its wheels retracted into wells in its outrigger floats, vertically braced under the engines.  Testing began in 1938 but the We 271 first flew, as a landplane on June 26, 1939 and as a flying boat two days later. In the spring of 1940 it was flown to the testing centre at Rechlin but the next year it was shot down by a Spitfire and was scrapped later in the war.

Specifications (We 271)

Notes

References

1930s German military utility aircraft
We 271
Amphibious aircraft
High-wing aircraft
Twin piston-engined tractor aircraft
Flying boats
Aircraft first flown in 1939